Digby Dent may refer to:

 Digby Dent (Royal Navy officer, died 1737), Royal Navy officer who served as Commander-in-Chief of the Jamaica Station
 Digby Dent (Royal Navy officer, died 1761) (1700–1761),  a Royal Navy officer—son of above—who served as Commander-in-Chief of the Jamaica Station
 Digby Dent (Royal Navy officer, died 1817) (1739–1817) Rear Admiral in the Royal Navy

See also 
 Dent (surname)